Gheorghe Calcișcă (born 10 January 1935) is a former Romanian cyclist. He competed in the individual road race at the 1960 Summer Olympics.

References

External links
 

1935 births
Living people
Romanian male cyclists
Olympic cyclists of Romania
Cyclists at the 1960 Summer Olympics
Sportspeople from Bucharest